Elistvere is a village in Tartu Parish, Tartu County, Estonia.  It has a population of 44 (as of 1 January 2009).

Elistvere Animal Park
Elistvere is the location of Elistvere Animal Park (:et), where visitors can see the animals living in Estonian forests.

References

External links
Elistvere Animal Park

Villages in Tartu County
Kreis Dorpat